Summit Township is one of fifteen townships in Effingham County, Illinois, USA.  As of the 2010 census, its population was 3,584 and it contained 1,654 housing units.

Geography

Cities, towns, villages
 Effingham (west edge)

Extinct towns
 Ewington
 Funkhouser

Cemeteries
The township contains these five cemeteries: Arborcrest, Blue Point Baptist, Brown, Ewington and Toothaker.

Major highways
  Interstate 57
  Interstate 70
  U.S. Route 40
  Illinois Route 32
  Illinois Route 33

Demographics

School districts
 Altamont Community Unit School District 10
 Beecher City Community Unit School District 20
 Effingham Community Unit School District 40

Political districts
 Illinois' 19th congressional district
 State House District 109
 State Senate District 55

References
 
 United States Census Bureau 2007 TIGER/Line Shapefiles
 United States National Atlas

External links
 City-Data.com
 Illinois State Archives

Townships in Effingham County, Illinois
1860 establishments in Illinois
Populated places established in 1860
Townships in Illinois